Krzysztof Szczecina (born 25 July 1990) is a Polish handball player for MMTS Kwidzyn and the Polish national team.

References

1990 births
Living people
Polish male handball players
Sportspeople from Kielce
Vive Kielce players